The following are the results of Ehime Football Club of Japan's 2011 season.

J2 League

References

External links
 J.League official site

Ehime FC
Ehime FC seasons